Donald Beckford (7 June 1907 – 11 October 1995) was a Jamaican cricketer. He played in twelve first-class matches for the Jamaican cricket team from 1931 and 1947.

See also
 List of Jamaican representative cricketers

References

External links
 

1907 births
1995 deaths
Jamaican cricketers
Jamaica cricketers
People from Saint Mary Parish, Jamaica